2016 Basketbol Süper Ligi (BSL) Playoffs was the final phase of the 2015–16 Basketbol Süper Ligi season. The playoffs started on 17 May 2016. Pınar Karşıyaka were the defending champions.

The eight highest placed teams of the regular season qualified for the playoffs. In the quarter-finals a best-of-three was played, in the semi-finals a best-of-five and in the finals a best-of-seven playoff format was used.

Fenerbahçe Ülker competed against Anadolu Efes in the finals, won the series 4-2 and got their 7th championship.

Bracket

Quarter-finals

Anadolu Efes vs. Royal Halı Gaziantep

Fenerbahçe vs. Uşak Sportif

Galatasaray Odeabank vs. Pınar Karşıyaka

Darüşşafaka Doğuş vs. Banvit

Semi-finals

Anadolu Efes vs. Darüşşafaka Doğuş

Fenerbahçe vs. Galatasaray Odeabank

Finals

Anadolu Efes vs. Fenerbahçe

References
TBL.org.tr
TBF.org.tr

Playoff
Turkish Basketball Super League Playoffs